Tarzana  is a suburban neighborhood in the San Fernando Valley region of Los Angeles, California. Tarzana is on the site of a former ranch owned by author Edgar Rice Burroughs. It is named after Burroughs' fictional jungle hero, Tarzan.

History
The area now known as Tarzana was occupied in 1797 by Spanish settlers and missionaries who established the San Fernando Mission. Later absorbed by Mexico, the land was surrendered to the United States in 1848 by the Treaty of Guadalupe Hidalgo following the Mexican–American War. Under US rule it evolved into a series of large cattle ranches. Investors took over in the 1870s, turning grazing into large-scale wheat farm operation.

The area was purchased in 1909 by the Los Angeles Suburban Homes Company. LA Times founder and publisher General Harrison Gray Otis  invested in the company and also personally acquired  in the center of modern-day Tarzana.

In February 1919, Edgar Rice Burroughs, author of the popular Tarzan novels, arrived in California with his family, relocating from Oak Park, Illinois. He and his family had wintered in Southern California twice before, and he found the climate ideal. On March 1, Burroughs purchased Otis's tract and established Tarzana Ranch. Burroughs subdivided and sold the land for residential development with neighboring small farms following suit.

Geography

Boundaries
Tarzana, which measures , is bounded on the south by Topanga State Park, on the east by Encino, on the north by Reseda and on the west by Woodland Hills.

Victory Boulevard marks the northern edge of the neighborhood, Lindley Avenue the eastern, Corbin Avenue, with a jog to Oakdale Avenue, the western, and Topanga State Park the southern.

Climate
Tarzana experiences a hot-summer Mediterranean climate. Due to its inland location, there is a higher degree of diurnal temperature variation than more coastal areas of Los Angeles.

Population
The U.S. census counted 35,502 people living in Tarzana in 2000, and Los Angeles estimated the neighborhood's population at 37,778 in 2008. There were 4,038 people per square mile, among the lowest population densities in the city.

According to the 2000 U.S. Census, the racial composition was predominantly white (70.7%), followed by Asian (5%), and black or African American (3.6%). The Los Angeles Times considered the area as "moderately diverse". 35.1% of the population was foreign-born, with Iranian (10.3%) and Russian (9.1%) as the most common ancestries. Iran (24.2%) and Mexico (12.1%) were the most common foreign places of birth.

The percentage of divorced men and women was among the county's highest. Some 9% of the residents were military veterans, considered high for the city of Los Angeles. The percentages of residents aged 50 and older were among the county's highest. The median age, 38, was old when compared to the rest of the city and the county. The median household income in 2008 dollars was considered high, at $73,195.

Notable people

Paul Abrahamian, reality television participant
 Paul Thomas Anderson, filmmaker
 Marc Anthony, singer
 Ed Asner, actor
 Banks, singer
Judy Blumberg, competitive ice dancer
 Edgar Rice Burroughs, author
 Cindy Bortz, 1987 World Junior Champion figure skater
 Chris Brown, singer 
Doja Cat, rapper, singer, songwriter, and record producer
Shavahn Church, American-British gymnast
Jordan Cohen (born 1997), American-Israeli basketball player 
Mike Connors, actor
Kaley Cuoco, actress and producer
Jason Derulo, singer
Jordan Farmar (born 1986), American-Israeli basketball player
Amanda Fink, tennis player
Selena Gomez, actress, singer
David Gregory, television journalist 
Chubby Johnson, actor; served as honorary mayor of Tarzana
 Gabe Kapler (born 1975), Major League Baseball outfielder, and manager (San Francisco Giants)
Khloé Kardashian, television personality
Luke Kennard, NBA player with the LA Clippers, lives in Tarzana
Lisa Kudrow, actress, grew up in Tarzana
 Blake Lively, actress, born in Tarzana
 Jon Lovitz, comedian and actor, born in Tarzana
 David Oyelowo, actor, lives in Tarzana
Rosanna Pansino, YouTube personality
Lyndsey Parker, entertainment journalist
 Paul Rodriguez, skateboarder, born in Tarzana
 Jim Rome, radio personality, born in Tarzana
JoJo Siwa, YouTube personality and reality television star
Hailee Steinfeld, actress and singer
Brody Stevens, comedian
Benny Urquidez, kickboxer, martial arts choreographer, and actor
Wilmer Valderrama, actor
Bobby Womack, soul singer-songwriter
Anton Yelchin, actor

Education

A total of 40.3% of Tarzana residents aged 25 and older have earned a four-year degree. Percentages of those residents with a bachelor's degree or with a master's degree are also high for the county.

Elementary and secondary schools
Schools within Tarzana are:

 Gaspar de Portola Middle School, LAUSD, 18720 Linnet Street
 Sherman Oaks Center for Enriched Studies (4–12), LAUSD alternative, 18605 Erwin Street
 Vanalden Avenue Elementary School, LAUSD, 19019 Delano Street
 Tarzana Elementary School, LAUSD, 5726 Topeka Drive
 CHIME Institute's Schwarzenegger Community School, LAUSD charter, 19722 Collier Street
 Wilbur Charter for Enriched Academics, LAUSD K–5, 5213 Crebs Avenue
 Nestle Avenue Elementary School, LAUSD, 5060 Nestle Avenue

Zoned high schools serving Tarzana include:
 Birmingham High School in (Lake Balboa area)
 Reseda High School (in Reseda area)
 Taft High School (in Woodland Hills area)

Private schools include:
 Lycée International de Los Angeles West Valley Campus

Postsecondary schools
 Columbia College Hollywood, a private nonprofit film school on Oxnard Street.

Public libraries

The Los Angeles Public Library operates the Encino-Tarzana Branch on Ventura Boulevard in Tarzana.

Recreation and parks
The Tarzana Recreation Center has a gymnasium that also is used as an auditorium; the building's capacity is 600. The park also has barbecue pits, a lighted baseball diamond, lighted outdoor basketball courts, a children's play area, a community room, an indoor gymnasium without weights, picnic tables, and lighted volleyball courts.

Caballero Canyon, located on the north side of the Santa Monica mountains in Tarzana offers multiple trails for hiking, mountain biking and unobstructed views of the San Fernando Valley. There is a 3.6 mile loop trail located here that is moderately trafficked and allows dogs on a leash. At the top of the trail hikers and mountain bikers will see signs leading the entrance of Topanga State Park. There are no fees or permits required to hike Caballero Canyon.

References

External links

     

 
Communities in the San Fernando Valley
Edgar Rice Burroughs
Neighborhoods in Los Angeles
Populated places in the Santa Monica Mountains
Populated places established in 1927
Tarzan
1927 establishments in California